is a Japanese speed skater. He competed in the men's 500 metres event at the 1984 Winter Olympics.

References

1962 births
Living people
Japanese male speed skaters
Olympic speed skaters of Japan
Speed skaters at the 1984 Winter Olympics
Sportspeople from Hokkaido
20th-century Japanese people